A space program is an organized effort by a government or a company with a goal related to outer space.

Lists of space programs include:
 List of government space agencies
 List of private spaceflight companies
 List of human spaceflight programs
 List of space programs of the United States
 List of uncrewed spacecraft by program

Space programs